Phoenix Pictures is an American film production company that has produced films since the late 1990s with features including Black Swan (2010), Shutter Island (2010), The People vs. Larry Flynt (1996), The Thin Red Line (1998), and Zodiac (2007).

History 
Producers Mike Medavoy and Arnold Messer founded Phoenix in November 1995 as an independent production company. They acquired financing from Onex Corporation, Pearson Television, and Sony Pictures Entertainment. It struck a deal with CBS to air its movies on network television. Its business model was based on packaging films to present to studios and to then navigate the films' development.

In 1996, the studio struck an exclusive deal with Showtime Networks to air its networks on pay television.

Films
The films that are produced by Phoenix.

1990s

2000s

2010s

2020s

Television

Television series/miniseries

Television movies

References

External links
 

1995 establishments in California
American companies established in 1995
American independent film studios
Companies based in Culver City, California
Entertainment companies based in California
Film production companies of the United States
Mass media companies established in 1995
Television production companies of the United States